Spiritual Appliances is an album by the American singer-songwriter Sara Hickman, released in 2000.

Production
The album was produced by Hickman. It was recorded in Austin, Texas.

Critical reception

The Austin Chronicle wrote that "there are songs built from the basic beginnings of an acoustic guitar and the singer singing sweetly that end in a near roar, while other tunes lead a chorus of whistlers through a pleasant bit of sentimentality and later, even a lush string section." Exclaim! thought that "all 13 tracks of the bright, airy, jangle pop have a rootsy edge and are full of memorable hooks." The Boston Globe wrote that the "singer-guitarist keeps her wry edge for most of the 13 songs on her self-produced album, rarely lapsing into the too sweet, too poignant, or too gooey."

Track listing 
"Standing Ground" (Sara Hickman) – 3:39
"Life" (Sara Hickman) – 4:04
"Kerosene" (Sara Hickman, Nick Trevisick) – 4:47
"Edward" (Sara Hickman, Danny Levin) – 4:02
"Woman Waiting to Happen" (Sara Hickman, Barbara K) – 6:43
"I Wish I Could Run" (Sara Hickman) – 4:08
"Everything's Red" (Sara Hickman, David Bassett) – 6:35
"Dear Tracy" (Sara Hickman) – 2:49
"Moment of Grace" (Sara Hickman) – 7:29
"Bowl Full of Stars" (Sara Hickman) – 3:48
"Come Around" (Barbara K) – 3:49
"We Are Each Other's Angels" (Chuck Brodsky, additional words by Sara Hickman) – 5:53
"I'm Not Going Anywhere" (Sara Hickman, Wendy Waldman) – 4:10

Personnel 
Sara Hickman – guitar, vocals
Jon Blondell – trombone
Daryl Burgee – tambourine
Javier Chaparro – violin, vocals
Michael Doane – bass guitar
Chip Dolan – piano, keyboards, didgeridoo, vocals
Tish Hinojosa – vocals
Glenn Kawamoto – bass guitar
Lloyd Maines – pedal steel
Mitch Marine – drums
John Mills – clarinet, flute, saxophone
Julie Noble – vocals
Riley Osbourne – organ
Paul Pearcy – percussion, drums
Gary Slechta – trumpet
Will Taylor – viola
Andy Timmons – guitar
Todd V. Wolfson – vocals

Production 
Producers: Sara Hickman
Engineers: Marty Lester, Fred Remmert
Assistant engineer: George Morgan
Mixing: John Anthony, Sara Hickman, Fred Remmert
Arranger: Sara Hickman
Horn arrangements: John Mills
String arrangements: Will Taylor
Design: Neil Ferguson
Photography: Todd V. Wolfson

References

Sara Hickman albums
2000 albums